Austrohahnia is a genus of South American dwarf sheet spiders that was first described by Cândido Firmino de Mello-Leitão in 1942.  it contains only three species, all found in Argentina: A. catleyi, A. melloleitaoi, and A. praestans.

References

Araneomorphae genera
Hahniidae
Spiders of Argentina
Taxa named by Cândido Firmino de Mello-Leitão